John Simon Fowler (born January 1956) is an English social historian and author who lives in Kew, Richmond, London and is vice-chair of the Richmond Local History Society. He has written many books relating to family history and social history. 

Fowler was editor of Richmond History, the annual journal of the Richmond Local History Society, from 2015 to 2019 and was editor of Ancestors, the family history magazine of The National Archives (UK), from 2004 until it ceased publication in 2010.   He edited Family History Monthly from 2000 to 2004.  His history-related articles have appeared in Local History Magazine, Family Tree, History Today, BBC History Magazine and several academic journals.

He was an archivist at the Public Record Office, now The National Archives, for 20 years. He was secretary of Labour Heritage, the Labour Oral History Project and the Friendly Societies Research Group.  He is also active with the London Archive Users Forum and the Brewery and Pub History societies.

Works
 (with William Spencer) Army Records for Family Historians (Public Record Office Readers' Guide), PRO Publications, 1998,  
 At the Heart of the Community: Victoria House, Kew 1980–2020, The Friends of Victoria House, 2022, 
 Family History: Digging Deeper, The History Press, 2012,  
 Family History Starter Pack: All You Need to Begin Your Family History Research, The National Archives (UK), 2004, 
 (with Ruth Paley) Family Skeletons: Exploring the lives of our disreputable ancestors,  The National Archives (UK), 2005, 
 A Guide to Military History on the Internet, Pen and Sword Books, 2007, 
 Joys of Family History: All You Need to Start Your Family Search, Public Record Office, 2002,  
 (with Daniel Weinbren) Now the War is Over: Britain 1919–1920, Pen and Sword Books, 2019, 
 (with Derek Robinson) Old Palace Lane: Medieval to Modern Richmond,  Museum of Richmond and Richmond Local History Society, 2017, ; second edition  2020, 
 The Phil: A History of the Richmond Philanthropic Society, Richmond: Philanthropic Society, 1997
 Philanthropy and the Poor Law in Richmond 1836–1871, Richmond Local History Society, 1991, ; revised second edition published as Poverty and Philanthropy in Victorian Richmond, Richmond Local History Society, 2017, 
 Railway Disasters (Images of Transport),  Wharncliffe Books, 2013, 
 Researching Brewery and Publican Ancestors, The Family History Partnership, 2009, 
 Richmond at War 1939–1945, Richmond Local History Society, 2015, 
 Richmond in the Census of 1851, Richmond Local History Society, 1988, 
 (with David Thomas and Valerie Johnson) The Silence of the Archive (Principles and Practice in Records Management and Archives), Facet Publishing, 2017, 
 Sources for Labour History (Public Record Office Readers' Guide), PRO Publications, 1996, 
 Starting Out in Local History, Countryside Books, 2001,  
 Tracing Irish Ancestors (Pocket Guides to Family History), Pen and Sword Books, 2001, 
 Tracing Scottish Ancestors, PRO Publications, 2001,  
 Tracing Your Ancestors, Pen and Sword Books, 2011, 
 Tracing Your Army Ancestors, Pen and Sword Books, 2006,  ; second edition 2013,  ; third edition 2017 
 Tracing Your First World War Ancestors: A Guide for Family Historians, Countryside Books, 2008,  ; second edition, Pen and Sword Books, 
 Tracing Your Great War Ancestors – The Gallipoli Campaign: A Guide for Family Historians, Pen and Sword Books, 2015, 
 Tracing Your Great War Ancestors – The Somme: A Guide for Family Historians, Pen and Sword Books, 2015, 
 Tracing Your Great War Ancestors – Ypres: A Guide for Family Historians, Pen and Sword Books, 2015, 
 Tracing Your Navy Ancestors, Pen and Sword Books, 2011,  
 Tracing Your Second World War Ancestors, Countryside Books, 2006, 
 Using Poor Law Records (Pocket Guides to Family History), PRO Publications, 2001,  
 The Workhouse: The People, The Places, The Life Behind Doors, The National Archives (UK), 2007, ; second edition, Pen and Sword Books, 2014,

Notes and references

External links
Official website
Fowler's 2001 history site

1956 births
Living people
20th-century English historians
21st-century English historians
English editors
English genealogists
English local historians
English male non-fiction writers
Historians of London
People associated with The National Archives (United Kingdom)
People from Kew, London
Richmond, London